This is a list of monuments and memorials to Pope John Paul II.

Argentina
 Posadas

Australia

 Sydney

Bosnia and Herzegovina
 Sarajevo

Canada 

 Toronto

Croatia

 Trsat

Germany
 Hanover

Ireland

Maynooth University, Maynooth

Italy
 Rome

Lithuania
 Šiluva
 Kaunas

Philippines

 Bacolod
 Malolos

Poland

Portugal

 Fátima
 Braga
 Coimbra

Slovakia
 Prešov  
 Košice  
 Bratislava

Slovenia 

 Brezje

Spain
 San Cristóbal de La Laguna
 Sevilla
 Madrid

United States
 Pope John Paul II Memorial (Boston)
 Chicago (2)
 Wyandotte, Michigan
 Denver
 Hamtramck, Michigan

See also
Pope John Paul II topics

Monuments
John Paul II
John Paul II